Oštrelj  is a village in the municipality of Bosanski Petrovac, Bosnia and Herzegovina.

Demographics 
According to the 2013 census, its population was 4, half of them Bosniaks and the other half of other ethnicity.

References

Populated places in Bosanski Petrovac